is a town located in Fukui Prefecture, Japan. , the town had an estimated population of 20,709 and the population density of 140 persons per km².

Geography
Echizen town is located in the Nyū District of central Fukui Prefecture, bordered by the Sea of Japan to the west. Parts of the coastal area of the town are within the borders of the Echizen-Kaga Kaigan Quasi-National Park.

Neighbouring municipalities 
Fukui Prefecture
Fukui
Echizen
Sabae
Minamiechizen

Climate
Echizen has a humid climate (Köppen Cfa) characterized by warm, wet summers and cold winters with heavy snowfall. The average annual temperature in Echizen is 14.3 °C. The average annual rainfall is 2402 mm with September as the wettest month. The temperatures are highest on average in August, at around 26.8 °C, and lowest in January, at around 2.9 °C. Parts of the town are located within the extremely heavy snowfall area of Japan.

Demographics
Per Japanese census data, the population of Echizen was relatively stable throughout the late 20th century but has declined in the 21st.

History
Echizen is part of ancient Echizen Province. During the Edo period, the area was mostly part of the holdings of Fukui Domain under the Tokugawa shogunate. Following the Meiji Restoration, and the establishment of the modern municipalities it was organised into part of Nyū District in Fukui Prefecture. The villages of Shirosaki and Shikaura were founded on April 1, 1889. Shikaura was raised to town status on August 1, 1946. The town of Echizen was formed on March 1, 1955 by the merger of Shikaura and Shirosaki. On February 1, 2005 the towns of Asahi and Ota, and the village of Miyazaki, all from Nyū District, were merged into Echizen.

Economy
The economy of Echizen town is mixed, with commercial fishing and agriculture prominent. Echizen is known for its production of high quality crab, rice, pottery, and daffodils.

Education
Echizen town has eight public elementary schools and four middle schools operated by the city government. The town has one public high school operated by the Fukui Prefectural Board of Education
 Nyu High School
 Echizen Junior High School
 Asahi Junior High School
 Miyazaki Junior High School
 Ota Junior High School

Transportation

Railway
Echizen town has no public passenger railway service.

Highway

Sister city relations

Sister cities 
  - Montevallo, Alabama (USA), since 2008
  - Miyama, Fukuoka (Japan)

Friendship cities 
  - Yeongdeok County (South Korea)
  - Nishio, Aisho (Japan)

Local attractions
Echizen-Kaga Kaigan Quasi-National Park
Echizen ware ceramics

References

External links

 
Echizen Town tourism website (in English)

 
Towns in Fukui Prefecture
Populated coastal places in Japan